The Florence metropolitan area may refer to:

The Florence (Firenze) metropolitan area, Italy
The Florence, South Carolina metropolitan area, United States
The Florence, Alabama metropolitan area, United States

See also
Florence (disambiguation)